Blurt is an English post-punk band, founded in 1979 in Stroud, Gloucestershire.

Background 
Blurt was founded in 1979 in Stroud, Gloucestershire by poet, saxophonist and puppeteer Ted Milton along with Milton's brother Jake, formerly of psychedelic group Quintessence, on drums and Peter Creese on guitar. After three albums Creese left the band to be replaced by Herman Martin on synthesizers who, after a year of constant touring left the band, and was replaced by Steve Eagles, former member of Satan's Rats, The Photos and Bang Bang Machine.

Shortly thereafter Jake Milton left to be replaced by Nic Murcott, who was subsequently replaced by Paul Wigens. Eagles was replaced by Chris Vine as guitarist from 1990 to 1994, and returned to the band following Vine's departure. Wigens was briefly replaced by Charles Hayward between May and October 2001 before returning to the band, before departing the band for good in 2005. His replacement was Bob Leith (of Cardiacs), who stayed with the band until 2008, at which time he was replaced by the band's current drummer Dave Aylward.

Most of Blurt's compositions feature simple, repetitive, minimalistic guitar and/or saxophone phrases, but they can also explore more abstract musical territories, often serving as an atmospheric backdrop for Ted Milton's existentialist poetry.

Personnel
Current members
Ted Milton – saxophone (1979–present)
Steve Eagles – guitar (1987–1990, 1994–present)
Dave Aylward – drums (2008–present)

Former members
Jake Milton – drums (1979–1988)
Peter Creese – guitar (1979–1986)
Herman Martin – synthesiser (1986–1987)
Nic Murcott – drums (1988)
Paul Wigens – drums (1988–2001, 2001–2005)
Chris Vine – guitar (1990–1994)
Charles Hayward – drums (2001)
Bob Leith – drums (2005–2008)

Discography 
 Studio albums

 Blurt (1982)
 Friday the 12th (1985)
 Poppycock (1986)
 Smoke Time (1987)
 Kenny Rogers' Greatest Hit (Take 2) (1989)
 The Kenny Rogers Greatest Hit (1991)
 Pagan Strings (1992)
 Celebrating the Bespoke Cell of Little Ease (1998)
 Cut It! (2010)
 Beneath Discordant Skies (2015)

 EPs

 White Line Fever (1984)
 The Body That They Built (1988)

 Live albums

 In Berlin (1981)
 Bullets for You (1984)
 The Body Live! (1989)

 Compilation albums

 The Best of Blurt – Volume 1 – The Fish Needs a Bike (2003)
 The Best of Blurt – Volume 2 – The Body That They Built to Fit the Car (2006)
 The Factory Recordings (2008)
 Blurt + Singles (2009)

 Singles

 "My Mother Was a Friend of an Enemy of the People"/"Get" (1980)
 "The Fish Needs a Bike"/"This Is My Royal Wedding Souvenir" (1981)
 "Trees" (live)/"Some Come" (live) (1982)
 "The Ruminant Plinth"/"Spill the Beans" (1983)
 "The Body That They Built to Fit the Car"/"Micky" (1987)
 "Cut It!"/"Hat" (2008)

References

External links 
 
 tedmilton.net
 

English post-punk music groups
Factory Records artists
Musical groups established in 1979
Factory Benelux artists